Trionfi may refer to:
 Plural of trionfo, Italian triumphal procession
 Trionfi (cards), 15th-century playing cards which in French are called "tarot cards"
 Trionfi (Carl Orff), a trilogy of cantatas
 "Trionfi" (poem), 14th-century poem by Petrarch